Catherine La Ora "Cathy" Boswell (born November 10, 1962) is an American former basketball player who competed in the 1984 Summer Olympics.

USA Basketball

Boswell was named to the team representing the US at the 1980 William Jones Cup competition in Taipei, Taiwan.  The USA team ended with a 7–2 record, which was a three-way tie for first place. The tie-breaker was point differential, and the USA did not win the tie-breaker, so ended up with the bronze medal. She was also named to the squad presenting the US in 1982. The team won their first seven games, but then ran into undefeated Canada, who beat the USA 70–67, leaving the US with the silver medal.

In 1983, Boswell represented the USA on the World University games team, coached by Jill Hutchison and held in Edmonton, Alberta, Canada. Although the USA lost to Romania in the preliminary rounds, and had to win every remaining game to remain in contention for a medal, the USA team bounced back to win a close game against Yugoslavia 86–85 and a rematch against Romania. The USA team was behind at halftime, but came back in the second half to win the game 83–61 and the gold medal. Boswell averaged 4.7 points per game.

In 1984, the USA sent its national team to the 1984 William Jones Cup competition in Taipei, Taiwan, for pre-Olympic practice. The team easily beat each of the eight teams they played, winning by an average of just under 50 points per game. Boswell averaged 7.0 points per game.

She continued with the national team to represent the US at the 1984 Olympics. The team won all six games to claim the gold medal. Boswell averaged 4.0 points per game.

References

External links
 

1962 births
Living people
African-American basketball players
All-American college women's basketball players
American expatriate basketball people in Brazil
American expatriate basketball people in France
American expatriate basketball people in Germany
American expatriate basketball people in Italy
American expatriate basketball people in Portugal
American expatriate basketball people in Spain
American women's basketball players
Atlanta Glory players
Basketball players at the 1984 Summer Olympics
Basketball players from Illinois
Chicago Condors players
Illinois State Redbirds women's basketball players
Medalists at the 1984 Summer Olympics
Olympic gold medalists for the United States in basketball
Sportspeople from Joliet, Illinois
Universiade gold medalists for the United States
Universiade medalists in basketball
Medalists at the 1983 Summer Universiade
21st-century African-American people
21st-century African-American women
20th-century African-American sportspeople
20th-century African-American women
20th-century African-American people
United States women's national basketball team players